Gregorio Werthein (born 15 September 1983) is an Argentine equestrian. He competed in two events at the 2004 Summer Olympics.

References

1983 births
Living people
Argentine male equestrians
Olympic equestrians of Argentina
Equestrians at the 2004 Summer Olympics
Sportspeople from Buenos Aires